The women's 3x3 basketball tournament at the 2019 Southeast Asian Games was held at the Filoil Flying V Centre, San Juan, Metro Manila from 1 to 2 December 2019. This was the first time 3x3 contest in the games. A tournament for men was also organized.

Results

Preliminary round

Final round

Semifinals

Bronze medal game

Final

See also
Men's 3x3 tournament

References

External links
  

Women 3x3